William L. Webber (July 19, 1825October 15, 1901) was a Michigan politician.

Early life
Webber was born in Ogden, New York on July 19, 1825 to parents James S. and Phebe Webber.

Career
Webber held a number of local positions in Saginaw County, Michigan, including circuit court commissioner and prosecuting attorney. Webber served as the Mayor of East Saginaw in 1873. Webber was elected to the Michigan Senate on November 6, 1874, where he represented the 25th district. He served in this position until 1876. Webber was delegation chair from Michigan during the 1876 Democratic National Convention. Webber was the Democratic nominee in the 1876 Michigan gubernatorial election, but was defeated by Charles Croswell.

Personal life
Webber was married to Nancy M. Whithington. Webber was a member of the Royal Arch Masons, the Odd Fellows, the Knights Templar, and was a Freemason.

Death
Webber died on October 15, 1901. He was interred at Forest Lawn Cemetery in Saginaw, Michigan.

References

1825 births
1901 deaths
Michigan lawyers
American Freemasons
Mayors of Saginaw, Michigan
Democratic Party Michigan state senators
Burials in Michigan
19th-century American politicians
19th-century American lawyers